Henry "Harry" Clay Taylor (4 March 1845 – 26 July 1904) was a rear admiral in the United States Navy who served in the American Civil War and the Spanish–American War.  He also served as Chief of the Bureau of Navigation and President of the Naval War College.

Early life and Civil War service
Taylor was born in Washington, D.C. He was appointed midshipman at the Naval Academy on 28 September 1860. When the Civil War expansion of the Navy engendered a pressing need for junior officers in the fleet, Midshipman Taylor's class was graduated a year early. He was commissioned ensign on 28 May 1863 and posted to the steam sloop  operating with the North Atlantic Blockading Squadron. In 1864, he was transferred to the sloop-of-war , in which he visited the Mediterranean and participated in the hunt for the Confederate raider .

Postbellum service
After the Civil War, Taylor served in a succession of ships on various stations. His next tour of duty, in 1868 and 1869, was with the European Squadron in the storeship .

Between 1869 and 1880, Taylor sandwiched two tours at sea in between two periods of shore duty. His first assignment ashore—in 1869, 1870, and 1871—was at the Naval Academy. Over the next three years, Lieutenant Commander Taylor commanded the United States Coast Survey steamer . In 1877, he came ashore once more, this time assigned to the Hydrographic Office. From there, he went to the Washington Navy Yard where he was serving at the time of his promotion to commander in December 1879.

In 1884 and 1885, he was on special duty at New York City. From 1885 to 1887, Taylor served as a member of the Board of Inspection and then took a leave of absence in 1888. In 1890, he returned to duty to command  on the Asiatic Station until September 1891 when he took another leave of absence until December 1892. After six months' special duty in 1893, Taylor became President of the Naval War College.

Spanish–American War
In April 1894, he was promoted to captain. His ship was assigned to the North Atlantic Squadron, and he commanded her through the Spanish–American War in 1898.

Flag assignments
In the fall of 1899, Taylor was detached from Indiana and assigned to shore duty. In March 1900, he became a member of the General Board and, 11 months later on 11 February 1901, he was promoted to rear admiral. On 29 April 1902, he assumed the post of Chief of the Bureau of Navigation, which he held until his death.

Namesakes
Three U.S. Navy vessels have been named Taylor.  The first  was named for Rear Admiral Henry Clay Taylor,  the second  commemorates Rear Admiral William Rogers Taylor, and the third ship  commemorates Commander Jesse Jr Taylor].

Burial
Admiral Taylor and his wife Mary Virginia are buried at Arlington National Cemetery.

References

 

1845 births
1904 deaths
American military personnel of the Spanish–American War
Burials at Arlington National Cemetery
Military personnel from Washington, D.C.
People of Washington, D.C., in the American Civil War
Presidents of the Naval War College
United States Naval Academy alumni
United States Navy admirals